"Shatter" is a song by the British rock band Feeder. "Shatter" was first released as B-side to "Tumble and Fall" and as a bonus to the Japanese edition of Pushing the Senses; it has since been included on the band's compilation album The Singles. 

Released on 10 October 2005, the single was backed by "Tender" from the fifth studio album Pushing the Senses, the combination reaching number 11 in the UK Singles Chart, and number one in the Independent Singles Chart; their third number one of the year on that chart. On the physical singles chart, which excludes downloads (at the time downloads didn’t make much of an impact in comparison to later years), the single made No.8, making it their fourth top 10 single on that chart and second top 10 of the year.

Music video
The video for "Tender" is a band performance video, and first appeared on the "Depot sessions" section of the Pushing the Senses DVD bonus disc.

"Shatter" uses clips from the movie Night Watch and recreated film sets the band are seen performing and acting in. Frontman Grant Nicholas revealed that the long tube he carried, was lit up by wires going up his arm from a battery pack, then up to a light in the tube.

Reception
The single peaked at number 11, and became Feeder's 10th Top 20 single, falling short of the top 10 and would have been the band's 4th top 10 single. However, in Scotland it reached number 9 giving the band their 4th top 10 single in that country and second of the year. In Wales, the single underperformed reaching number 32, which was seen as a failure especially being their homeland.

The video for "Shatter", reached number one on the UK 3 download chart and also reached the summit of the UK Independent Singles Chart. 

"Shatter" charted at number 57 on the top 100 UK airplay chart. "Tender" reached number 55 but did not pick up as much audience figures overall, due to not being given very much radio play, as "Shatter" was the main track to promote the release.

The song was a live regular between 2005–2009, with it later making a return to setlists in 2017 due to fan votes on their Facebook page (also with an acoustic intro as opposed to a hi-hat effect used in the past).

Media usage
The two tracks on the single are played during the end credits of the UK and international releases of the Russian dark fantasy film Night Watch, though on the American release, both songs are replaced by "Fearless" by The Bravery and an instrumental piece. "Shatter" was originally a part of the Gran Turismo 4 Original Soundtrack.

Track listing
CD single
 "Shatter" (new version)
 "Tender" (radio version)
 "Everybody Hurts"
 "Tender" (enhanced video)

DVD single
 "Shatter" (video)
 "Making of Shatter – behind the scenes"
 "Tender – We The Undersigned – 'The Shatter Vote'"
 "Everybody Hurts – Your War Is Not With Me" (War Child video) .

7-inch single
 "Shatter" (original version)
 "Tender" (radio version)

Charts

References

2005 singles
Feeder songs
2005 songs
The Echo Label singles
UK Independent Singles Chart number-one singles